Ronald Virgil Pelosi (born November 2, 1934) is an American businessman and public figure in San Francisco, California.

Biography
Pelosi was born in San Francisco in an Italian-American family on November 2, 1934, and was reared in that city. He has a brother, Paul Pelosi. He earned a bachelor's degree in American history from Stanford University in 1956, the same year he and Barbara Newsom were married; they divorced in 1977. He was remarried in 1979,  to Susan Ferguson. His children were Carolyn and Cynthia (died 1970), Brennan, Matt Pelosi, Laurence (born 1971) and Andrew (born 1981).

He is the brother-in-law of Nancy Pelosi, the Speaker of the United States House of Representatives. He is a former uncle-by-marriage of Governor of California Gavin Newsom.

Business experience

Finance
Pelosi engaged in the securities industry with Hambrecht & Quist, Dean Witter & Co. and was a partner in  Korn Ferry International, an executive search firm and president of the Longwood Company, a member firm of the Financial Industry Regulatory Authority.

He was also president of Forward Funds, a diversified mutual fund group, of Webster Investment Management, registered investment advisers; and Trenholm Associates. Pelosi is on the board of trustees of the Pacific Corporate Group, a private equity fund and executive director, of Pacific Asset Management.

Mediation and arbitration
Pelosi was a mediator or arbitrator for the American Stock Exchange, National Association of Securities Dealers, National Futures Association, New York Stock Exchange and the Financial Industry Regulatory Authority. He was a  panel member of the American Arbitration Association and the Pacific Coast Stock Exchange.

Public service
Pelosi was a member of the San Francisco City Planning Commission, and of the San Francisco Board of Supervisors from 1968 to 1980, of which he was president from 1978 to 1980. He was chairman of the board of the San Francisco Employees' Retirement System and was on the boards of directors of the  Association of Bay Area Governments, Golden Gate Bridge District and the League of California Cities.

He was an unsuccessful Democratic candidate for California's 9th State Senate district in 1972. He took just 40.1 percent of the vote against Republican Milton Marks, who had 59 percent.

References

Pelosi family
Living people
Businesspeople from San Francisco
Stanford University alumni
San Francisco Board of Supervisors members
California Democrats
American people of Italian descent
1934 births
Newsom family
20th-century American businesspeople
Candidates in the 1972 United States elections